James Sloan is the name of:

 James Sloan, co-founder of the Orange Institution in 1795
 James F. Sloan (1947–2009), head of US Coast Guard Intelligence
 James Sloan (congressman) (died 1811), United States Congressman from New Jersey
 James Sloan (Latter Day Saints) (1792–1886), early Latter Day Saint and secretary to Joseph Smith, Jr
 James Park Sloan (born 1945), American writer and critic
 James Blanding Sloan (1886–1975), American etcher, printmaker and theatrical designer..

See also
 James Sloan Kuykendall (1878–1928), American lawyer and politician in the U.S. state of West Virginia